Adolfów  is a village in the administrative district of Gmina Ceranów, within Sokołów County, Masovian Voivodeship, in east-central Poland.

The village has a population of 60.

References

Villages in Sokołów County